Hermann Hyacinthe Ouédraogo (born 12 December 1981) is a Burkina Faso football player who is currently playing for Union Sportive de Ouagadougou.

Career
Ouédraogo began his career with the Planéte Champions and joined in summer 2004 to French club FC Istres, but after a bad first half of the 2004–2005 season turned in January 2005 back to Burkina Faso and signed for  Union Sportive de Ouagadougou.

International career
He was part of the Burkinabé team, who finished of the fourth place in the 2006 FIFA World Cup qualification (CAF) and played his last game at the UEMOA Tournament 2007.

References

Living people
1981 births
Sportspeople from Ouagadougou
Association football forwards
Burkinabé footballers
Burkina Faso international footballers
Planète Champion players
FC Istres players
US Ouagadougou players
Ligue 1 players
Expatriate footballers in France
Burkinabé expatriates in France
Burkinabé Premier League players
21st-century Burkinabé people